Losing Control is a 2011 American romantic comedy film written, produced and directed by Valerie Weiss about a female scientist who wants proof that her boyfriend is "the one." Losing Control was released theatrically on March 23, 2012 in New York City and will expand to more cities on March 30, 2012.  The film won Best Director at the 2011 Feel Good Film Festival, Connie Clair Spirit Award for Top Female Filmmaker of 2011 at The Chicago Comedy Film Festival and First Honorable Mention for the Christopher Wetzel Independent Film Comedy Award.

Cast 
 Miranda Kent as Samantha
 Reid Scott as Ben
 Kathleen Robertson as Leslie
 Theo Alexander as Maurizio
 Steve Howey as Terry
 John Billingsley as Prof. Straub
 Sumalee Montano as Breanna Lee
 Bitsie Tulloch as Trudy
 Alanna Ubach as Alora
 Neil Hopkins as Scott Foote
 Lin Shaye as Dolores
 Ben Weber as Dr. Rudy Mann
 Jamison Yang as Chen Wa
 Barry Gordon as Frank
Elise Jackson as Vivienne
 Sam Ball as Tantric Sam
True Bella Pinci as Little Samantha

Critical reception
The film received mixed reviews.  On the website metacritic, which assigns normalized scores to reviews, the film received a 33 out of 100, indicating "generally unfavorable" reviews.

From Calum Marsh, in Slant Magazine:

From John Anderson, in Variety:

From Steven Rea in The Philadelphia Inquirer:

References

External links 
 
 
 "Film Journal: The Making of an Independent Feature", The Independent, August 2009 
 'Losing Control' In The Movies, Science Friday, March 23, 2012

2011 films
2011 romantic comedy films
American romantic comedy films
Films scored by John Swihart
2011 directorial debut films
2010s English-language films
Films directed by Valerie Weiss
2010s American films